The 1950–51 La Liga season was the 20th edition of the Spanish football top division. Defending champions Atlético Madrid achieved their fourth title, securing it with a 1–1 draw on the final matchday away to Sevilla, their direct rivals for the championship who would have taken the trophy with a win, had a 100% home record up to that point, and who won the league five years earlier in almost identical circumstances.

Format
This was the first season after the expansion of the league to 16 teams. The two last qualified teams were directly relegated to Segunda División and teams in the 13th and 14th position joined the relegation play-offs with the second and third qualified teams of each one of the two groups of the Segunda División.

Team locations

Lérida made their debut in La Liga.

League table

Results

Relegation group
Teams qualified in the 13th and 14th position joined the relegation group with the teams qualified in the second and third group of each one of the two groups of the Segunda División. The two top teams would play the next La Liga season.

Standings

Results

Top scorers
                       Larbi benbarek

References

External links
 
Official LFP Site 

1950 1951
1950–51 in Spanish football leagues
Spain